Maksim Kononenko (born 13 March 1971 in Apatity, Russian SFSR) is an ex journalist, writer, TV show host, and political activist.

Kononenko is a member of the council of the party Civilian Power.

Biography 
Kononenko was born in Apatity, USSR. One of the pioneers of Russian Internet, he is known under the nickname Mr. Parker. He graduated from Moscow State Institute of Radio-engineering Electronics and Automation and also studied at Maxim Gorky Literature Institute. He has authored or participated in countless Internet projects. For nearly ten years, he worked as the leading programmer in ParallelGraphics.

He participated in 2005 Moscow City Duma elections but failed.

He worked as editor-in-chief of a major Internet news website Dni.ru until 2009. He now works as editor-in-chief of Bourgeois Journal and political newspaper Re:Action.

In 2002, he founded a popular website vladimir.vladimirovich.ru, which contains humorous fake stories from the life of Vladimir Putin based on real events and current news.

He often appears on Russian TV and hosts a show Real politics on NTV channel.

In 2011, he repeatedly spoke favorably about doghunters - representatives of the emerging subculture engaged in the destruction of flocks of stray dogs.

In December 2011, the website of the newspaper "Vzglyad" published an author's column by Maksim Kononenko, in which he actively criticized the organizers and participants of “rallies against election fraud”.

Awards 

 "Teneta" literary award (1st prize, 1995)
 Computer programmer of the year and Person of the year ("Rotor", 2000)
 Internet writer of the year (2003, 2004) ur

References

External links 
 Kononenko's blog
 vladimir.vladimirovich.ru
 Biography on the party website (in Russian)

1971 births
Living people
People from Apatity
Russian writers
Russian journalists
Russian bloggers
Maxim Gorky Literature Institute alumni